Dixon Unified School District is a public school district based in Solano County, California, United States.  It includes Dixon High School.

List of Schools
High schools
 Dixon High School 
 Maine Prairie High School (continuation school)

Middle schools
John Knight Middle School (formerly known as C.A. Jacobs Middle School)

Elementary schools
Silveyville (closed as of 2008)
Anderson
Gretchen Higgins
Tremont

References

External links
 

School districts in Solano County, California